Rhabdophis swinhonis is a species of snake in the subfamily Natricinae of the family Colubridae. The species is endemic to Taiwan. It is also known commonly as the Taiwan keelback and Swinhoe's grass snake.

Etymology
The specific name, swinhonis, is in honour of Robert Swinhoe, a British diplomat and naturalist stationed in China in mid-19th century, who collected the holotype.

Description
It has 15–17 rows of keeled dorsal scales. The head is oval, the body is moderately stout, and the tail is moderately long. The medium to large eye has a dark grey-brown iris and a round, jet black pupil surrounded by a grey ring. The body is dorsally dark grey-brown with ill-defined or fairly prominent square areas of black. The underside is cream to light grey and is mottled with deposits of coarse dark pigment. The head is uniform dark olive grey to olive brown above, while the sides are lighter. There is an oblique black band below the eye as well as a larger black band on the side of head, above the corner of mouth. The nape bears a distinct, thick, and black backward-pointing chevron. The anal scale is divided and the subcaudal scales are paired.

Defensive behaviour
R. swinhonis is non-venomous and docile; when threatened it may expand its throat and neck transversely, but is unlikely to bite. It has nuchal glands that secrete a brown liquid; this may act as a predator deterrent, although its precise function remains unknown.

Reproduction
Reproduction in R. swinhonis is through oviparity. Each clutch contains 6–15 eggs.

Geographic range and habitat
It is a diurnal snake that lives on the forest floor, bushlands, and other humid environments. They also occur in agricultural fields.

Diet
The main prey of R. swinhonis is frogs.

Conservation
R. swinhonis is an uncommon species. It is not facing significant threats, occurs in protected areas, and enjoys Class III protection.

References

Further reading

Boulenger GA (1893). Catalogue of the Snakes in the British Museum (Natural History). Volume I., Containing the Families ... Colubridæ Aglyphæ, part. London: Trustees of the British Museum (Natural History). (Taylor and Francis, printers). xiii + 448 pp. + Plates I–XXVIII. (Tropidonotus swinhonis, p. 218).
Günther A (1868). "Sixth Account of new Species of Snakes in the Collection of the British Museum". Annals and Magazine of Natural History, Fourth Series 1: 413–429. (Tropidonotus Swinhonis, new species, p. 420 + Plate XIX, figure F).
Stejneger L (1907). Herpetology of Japan and Adjacent Territory. United States National Museum Bulletin 58. Washington, District of Columbia: Smithsonian Institution. xx + 577 pp. (Natrix swinhonis, new combination, pp. 293–294, Figure 256).
Stejneger L (1911). "The Batrachians and Reptiles of Formosa". Proceedings of the United States National Museum 38: 91–114. (Natrix swinhonis, p. 103).

Rhabdophis
Snakes of Asia
Reptiles of Taiwan
Endemic fauna of Taiwan
Taxa named by Albert Günther
Reptiles described in 1868